Serghei Nani (born 10 August 1970) is a retired Moldovan football midfielder.

References

1970 births
Living people
Moldovan footballers
FC Zimbru Chișinău players
CSF Bălți players
Go Ahead Eagles players
Maccabi Kafr Kanna F.C. players
FC Kristall Smolensk players
Association football midfielders
Moldovan expatriate footballers
Expatriate footballers in the Netherlands
Moldovan expatriate sportspeople in the Netherlands
Expatriate footballers in Israel
Moldovan expatriate sportspeople in Israel
Expatriate footballers in Russia
Moldovan expatriate sportspeople in Russia
Moldova international footballers